Lucy Boynton (born 17 January 1994) is a British-American actress. Raised in London, she made her professional debut as the young Beatrix Potter in Miss Potter (2006). She starred in television productions Ballet Shoes (2007), Sense and Sensibility (2008) and Mo (2010), making guest appearances on Lewis, Borgia, Endeavour, and Law & Order: UK. Boynton portrayed writer Angelica Garnett on Life in Squares, which aired on BBC. She appeared as an isolated popular girl in The Blackcoat's Daughter (2015) and starred as a bold aspiring model in Sing Street (2016), which met with critical acclaim. She appeared in horror films I Am the Pretty Thing That Lives in the House (2016) and Don't Knock Twice (2016), receiving praise for her performance in the latter.

Boynton portrayed J. D. Salinger's wife in Rebel in the Rye (2017), which had a negative reception. She played Countess Andrenyi in Murder on the Orient Express (2017), which was a commercial success. Boynton portrayed an addict in Netflix's Gypsy (2017) and the daughter of a cult leader in Apostle (2018). Boynton gained recognition for starring as Mary Austin in the biopic Bohemian Rhapsody (2018), which received numerous accolades and was a box office success. She appeared in HBO Max's Locked Down (2021). Boynton stars as the privileged antagonist Astrid Sloan in the Netflix series The Politician, appeared in the second season of Modern Love, and starred in ITV's The Ipcress File (2022).

Early life and education 
Boynton was born in New York City to English parents, journalists Graham Boynton and Adrianne Pielou. The younger of two daughters, Boynton was raised in southeast London. She retains dual citizenship of the United Kingdom and the United States. Boynton realized she wanted to act when she was ten, after a drama teacher taught her that "acting was not playing pretend; it was understanding the human mind and why people function as they do." She attended the private Blackheath High School, followed by James Allen's Girls' School in Dulwich.

Career

2006–2014: Early roles

Boynton's made her professional debut at age twelve as young Beatrix Potter in the biographical film Miss Potter (2006). She was asked to audition after being spotted by a casting director sitting in on her drama class. Additional scenes were written for her character after a test screening responded positively to her role. Boynton wore corsets and padded clothing to portray a younger Potter. Boynton stated that the first day of filming was "the best day of [her] life". In 2007, she was nominated for the Young Artist Award for Best Supporting Actress, for Miss Potter. Boynton starred as Posy Fossil in the BBC film Ballet Shoes (2007). A body double was used in some scenes to display her character's "remarkable dancing skill". The film was praised by critics.

Boynton portrayed Margaret Dashwood in the 2008 television adaptation of Jane Austen's novel Sense and Sensibility. The miniseries premiered to high viewership and positive reviews. Boynton has described experiencing a "difficult period" from ages 16 to 17 for being "too old for young roles, but too young to play the leading lady." She played Mo Mowlam's stepdaughter in television film Mo (2010). In 2011, She appeared in an episode of the ITV drama Lewis. In 2013, she starred in Saint Raymond's music video for the lead single from his debut extended play, "Fall At Your Feet". Boynton appeared in period drama Copperhead (2013) based on the novel of the same name by Harold Frederic. In 2014, she guest-starred in the television series Borgia, Endeavour, and Law & Order: UK. She played Angelica Garnett, a member of the Bloomsbury Group, in the BBC miniseries Life in Squares, which aired in 2015. To prepare for the part, she read Garnett's memoir, Deceived with Kindness, in which most of her scenes were detailed, which she described as "a dream for any actor". The series was reviewed positively.

2015–2020: Film work and recognition

Boynton appeared as "sullen mean girl" Rose alongside Emma Roberts and Kiernan Shipka in The Blackcoat's Daughter (2015). She prepared for the film by watching films that dealt with isolation and grief, such as Rosemary’s Baby on the recommendation of director Oz Perkins. Chuck Bowen of Slant Magazine wrote that Roberts, Shipka, and Boyton were "poignant in their minimalist roles".  Boynton starred in the coming-of-age film Sing Street (2016) as Raphina, an aspiring model with "huge hair, bright make-up and colorful clothes". Boynton described her role as "the muse character, in a way, but only because she has put herself there". She adopted an Irish accent for the film and was instructed by director John Carney to create a backstory "in much more detail than [she] had before." The film premiered to critical praise at the Sundance Film Festival and garnered a Golden Globe nomination for Best Motion Picture – Musical or Comedy. She appeared as ghostly bride Polly Parsons in the gothic-horror film I Am the Pretty Thing That Lives in the House (2016), which opened at the Toronto International Film Festival to mixed reception. Boynton starred alongside Katee Sackhoff in indie-horror Don't Knock Twice (2016). Noel Murray of the Los Angeles Times praised Sackhoff and Boynton's "volatile chemistry", stating that "they bring so much life to the material that it’s almost like they’ve been tricked into thinking they’re in a better movie." 

She portrayed J. D. Salinger's second wife, Claire Douglas, in Rebel in the Rye (2017). Rebel in the Rye premiered at the Sundance Film Festival and was panned by critics. Boynton played Countess Helena Andrenyi in the 2017 adaptation of Murder on the Orient Express. The film was a box office success and received mixed reviews, though the performances of the cast were praised. In the same year, Boynton starred as Allison Adams, a college student turned drug addict, in the Netflix series Gypsy (2017). Boynton empathised with her character's desire to regress into early life while struggling with control. Daniel Fienberg of The Hollywood Reporter cited Boynton as "splendid-but-underused" and among the "best of the supporting turns". She appeared as Andrea, the daughter of a cult leader, in Apostle (2018), which was praised by critics.

Boynton starred opposite Rami Malek as Freddie Mercury's partner Mary Austin in Bohemian Rhapsody (2018). She watched Austin's interviews to "gauge what she was happy to be open about" and spoke to Brian May to research the role. The film became the highest-grossing biographical film of all time and met mixed criticism. Time praised her for playing the role with "charm and vigor" while the Irish Independent wrote that her scenes were the "quietest, most touching moments" of the film. Bohemian Rhapsody received four Academy Awards and earned the cast a nomination for Outstanding Performance by a Cast in a Motion Picture at the 25th Screen Actors Guild Awards.

Boynton appears opposite Taron Egerton in Glimpse, a short virtual reality animated film premiering at the Virtual Reality showcase of the Venice Film Festival in 2019.

Since 2019, Boynton has starred in the Netflix series The Politician, portraying Astrid Sloane, the protagonist's "ruthless" and "hyperbolically privileged" rival. Boynton described the experience "liberating", saying that playing an antagonistic character added depth to the role. The Hollywood Reporter praised Boynton's "razor-sharp delivery" but remarked that her written dialogue prevented her from being "spectacular".

2021-present 
In February 2020, it was announced that Boynton would be both executive producer and lead actor in the upcoming Marianne Faithfull biopic, Faithfull. Production was originally due to begin in October 2020, but was delayed indefinitely due to the ongoing COVID-19 pandemic. The film will cover Faithfull's rise to fame until the age of 23.

Boynton had a supporting role as Charlotte, a Harrods shop assistant, in Locked Down (2021), released on HBO Max. The film received mixed reviews. She guest-starred opposite Kit Harington in the second season of Amazon Video's anthology series Modern Love in 2021.

In 2022, Boynton starred in ITV's six-part miniseries The Ipcress File as Jean Courtney, Harry Palmer's colleague, and also stars in the Stephen Williams-directed biographical film Chevalier as Marie Antoinette. She plays a leading role in BritBox's three-part adaptation of Agatha Christie's crime novel Why Didn't They Ask Evans?, and also stars in the Netflix film The Pale Blue Eye, based on Louis Bayard's Gothic thriller novel of the same name. In August 2022, it was revealed Boynton would star in The Greatest Hits, written and directed by Ned Benson for Searchlight Pictures, after having dropped out of Faithfull owing to creative differences.

Personal life
Boynton divides her time between London, New York, and Los Angeles, though she considers herself to be "painfully British". Since 2018, she has been in a relationship with her Bohemian Rhapsody co-star Rami Malek.

Filmography

Film

Television

Music videos

See also
 List of British actors

Notes

External links
 
 Lucy Boynton on Rotten Tomatoes
 

1994 births
Actresses from London
American child actresses
American film actresses
American television actresses
American people of English descent
British child actresses
British film actresses
British television actresses
Living people
People educated at Blackheath High School
People educated at James Allen's Girls' School
21st-century British actresses
21st-century American actresses
21st-century English women
21st-century English people